Zhang Yongjun (born 4 January 1963 in Huangshi, Hubei) is a Chinese basketball coach and former international player who competed in the 1988 and 1992 Summer Olympic Games for China. In 2014, he was named the head coach of the Zhejiang Chouzhou Golden Bulls, a professional club in the Chinese Basketball Association (CBA).

References 

1963 births
Living people
Asian Games medalists in basketball
Basketball players at the 1986 Asian Games
Basketball players at the 1988 Summer Olympics
Basketball players at the 1990 Asian Games
Basketball players at the 1992 Summer Olympics
Basketball players from Hebei
Zhejiang Golden Bulls players
Chinese men's basketball players
1990 FIBA World Championship players
Olympic basketball players of China
Asian Games gold medalists for China
Medalists at the 1986 Asian Games
Medalists at the 1990 Asian Games